Vitalis may refer to:

People

Given name
 Vitalis Chikoko (born 1991), Zimbabwean professional basketball player
 Vitalis Takawira (born 1972), Zimbabwean footballer
 Vitalis Zvinavashe (1943–2009), Zimbabwean military figure and politician

Surname
 Gobeom Sie Vitalis (born 1990), Liberian footballer
 Marie Vitalis (1890–1941), French flying ace
 Mark Vitalis (born 1968), West Indian cricketer
 Orderic Vitalis (1075–c. 1142), English chronicler and Benedictine monk
 Vangelis Vitalis (born 1969), New Zealand diplomat

Mononymous
 Saint Vitalis (disambiguation), various people
 Vitalis of Albano (active 1111–1126), cardinal-bishop
 Vitalis of Assisi (1295–1370), Italian hermit and monk
 Vitalis of Bernay (unknown–1085), Benedictine monk from Normandy
 Vitalis of Farfa (fl. 888), Italian abbot
 Vitalis of Gaza (unknown–c. 625), hermit and monk
 Vitalis of Milan (c. 1st century), Christian martyr and saint
 Vitalis of Savigny (c. 1060–1122), founder of Savigny Abbey in France
 Vitalis, Sator and Repositus (c. 4th century), Christian martyrs

Other
 Keiferia vitalis, a moth in the family Gelechiidae
 Mare Vitalis, 2000 album by The Appleseed Cast
 St. Vitalis Church in Włocławek, in Poland
 Vitalis, a hair tonic formerly made by Bristol-Myers, now owned by Helen of Troy Limited

See also
 Lumbricus terrestris, a type of worm in North America
 Vitali (disambiguation)